("the work line") is a social political principle that emphasizes measures that primarily attempt to give the unemployed jobs instead of assistance in the form of allowance, as much as possible. This line was developed in Sweden between the years 1914 and 1920, and the term itself was used as early as the 1920s.

Arbetslinjen has been the main theme of the Moderate Party since 2005 and the core of former Prime Minister Fredrik Reinfeldt's policies with lower taxes for low and middle income earners, reduced allowance and increased focus on reducing exclusion. Arbetslinjen has since been adapted by the social democrats and the closely allied LO with a slightly different focus. However, there is a consensus regarding that people should be "stimulated", and or (de facto) forced to into waged work, or actively seek employment to be eligible for support from the society. This was done by among other things, implementing a program known as FAS-3 (Swedish:Phase-3) which over time became a controversial issue.

See also
Folkhemmet
Social democracy
Welfare state

References

Sources 

Society of Sweden